William Mower Akhurst (29 December 1822 – 6/7 June 1878) was an actor, journalist and playwright in Australia.

Akhurst was born in Hammersmith, London or Brook Street, Grosvenor Square, London, a son of William Akhurst (1793–1866) and Harriet Akhurst, née Dickinson (c. 1788–1869), who married in 1845.
From age 14 to 26 he worked for a firm of merchants in the manchester goods, but his real interest was in performing and writing for the theatre. In 1847 he wrote two pieces for Greenwood, the manager of the Cremorne Gardens theatre: A  Barber's Blunders and The Bosjemans (Bosjesmen?), both of which were successfully staged that year.

He emigrated to Australia, arriving in Adelaide by the barque Posthumous, in June 1849. and found employment as reporter and sub-editor for James "Dismal Jemmy" Allen's newly launched Adelaide Times. 

He came to public attention when he assisted the widow and orphan children of a fellow journalist, who died at sea after a long illness, leaving her destitute.
He gave the theatre-going public a taste of his play-writing talents with musical sketches or plays: Quite Colonial, and Romance and Reality at several of the concerts given by the Nelson family while that troupe was in Adelaide May–August 1853. A third, The Rights of a Woman, would be performed in Melbourne 24 July 1854. The songs were written by Akhurst to fit recognised tunes as played on the piano by Sidney Nelson.

On 15 October 1853 he launched a newspaper, South Australian Free Press, which failed to thrive and ceased publication with the issue of 1 April 1854. This was the era of gold fever, when much of South Australia's population had left for the goldfields of Victoria and New South Wales, to the detriment of their home colony's economy. Akhurst collected what outstanding subscriptions he could, and joined the "rush".
Melbourne was in its boom years, and Akhurst had no trouble finding employment; he joined the Melbourne Argus as sub-editor and music critic. Subsequently, he wrote fourteen pantomimes; one of his burlesques, the Siege of Troy, running for sixty nights, and Knights of the Round Table also popular, both starring Richard Stewart and H. R. Harwood with scene painting (in those days as much a drawcard as the acting) by John Hennings. 
In February 1870 he returned to England, and wrote pantomimes for Astley's, the Pavilion, and the Elephant and Castle theatres. He died on board the Patriarch, on the return voyage to Sydney.

Works
 1866 The happy delivery of a legal lady in Jolop Street East
 1866 Gulliver on his travels, or Harlequin Old Father Christmas
 1868 King Arthur, or The Knights of the Round Table, and
 1868 The Siege of Troy, burlesques written expressly for the Theatre Royal, Melbourne
Pantomimes
Arabian Nights 1862
Baron Munchausen 1865
Gulliver on his Travels 1866
House that Jack Built 1869
Jack Sheppard 1869
L. S. D. 1855
Little Jack Horner 1860
Last of the Ogres 1864
Robin Hood 1853
Robinson Crusoe 1868
Rule of Three 1856
Tom Tom, the Piper's Son 1867
Whittington and His Cat 1857
Valentine and Orson 1867

Family 
In 1845 Akhurst married Ellen Tully (1824–1915), whose brother James H. Tully was a conductor at Drury Lane (or Covent Garden) theatre. Their family included: 
Adrian Charles Akhurst (1848–1927), born in England, married Christina Mitchell on 26 January 1872
Arthur William Akhurst (1851–1907), born in Adelaide
Sidney Philip Akhurst (24 August 1852 – 1915), born in Adelaide, married Alice Kitz on 15 January 1880
Walter Frederick Akhurst (2 January 1854 – 6 April 1904), born in Adelaide married Kate Deutsch on 16 November 1874. He was a printer and music publisher.
William Howard Akhurst (8 June 1858 – 15 January 1873), born 21 Brunswick Street, Melbourne, married Emilie Kate Napthaly on 4 July 1885
Carl Adrian Akhurst (14 June 1886 – 8 September 1953), accountant and politician
Thomas Carlyle Akhurst (17 April 1861 – 1934), master printer, born 36 Gore Street, Collingwood, died 70 King William Street, Fitzroy
Victor Hugo Akhurst (16 January 1863 – )
Oscar James Akhurst (2 December 1864 – 1940)

Sources 

William Wilde, Joy Hooton & Barry Andrews, The Oxford Companion to Australian literature, OUP, Melbourne, 1986, p. 20.

Notes

References

1822 births
1878 deaths
English emigrants to colonial Australia
19th-century Australian dramatists and playwrights
Australian male dramatists and playwrights
Australian journalists
The Argus (Melbourne) people